XHNAR-FM (103.3 FM) is a radio station in Linares, Nuevo León, known as Vive FM. XHNAR is part of the Nuevo León state-owned Radio Nuevo León public network.

References

Radio stations in Nuevo León